is a former Japanese footballer. He played for Japan national team.

Club career
Arai was born in Etajima on October 24, 1950. After graduating from high school, he joined Furukawa Electric in 1969. In 1976, the club won Japan Soccer League and Emperor's Cup. The club also won 1977 JSL Cup. He retired in 1978. He played 124 games and scored 17 goals in the league. He was selected Best Eleven 4 times (1971, 1973, 1974 and 1976).

National team career
In December 1970, Arai was selected Japan national team for 1970 Asian Games. At this competition, on December 10, he debuted against Malaysia. He also played at 1974 Asian Games, 1972 Summer Olympics qualification, 1974 World Cup qualification and 1976 Summer Olympics qualification. He played 47 games and scored 4 goals for Japan until 1977.

Club statistics

National team statistics

Awards
 Japan Soccer League Best Eleven: 1971, 1973, 1974, 1976
 Japan Soccer League Fighting Spirit: 1971

References

External links
 
 Japan National Football Team Database

1950 births
Living people
Association football people from Hiroshima Prefecture
People from Etajima, Hiroshima
Japanese footballers
Japan international footballers
Japan Soccer League players
JEF United Chiba players
Footballers at the 1970 Asian Games
Footballers at the 1974 Asian Games
Association football midfielders
Asian Games competitors for Japan